Budești is a commune located in Vâlcea County, Romania. It is composed of eight villages: Barza, Bercioiu, Bârsești, Budești, Linia, Piscu Pietrei, Racovița and Ruda. It is situated in the historical region of Muntenia.

References 

Communes in Vâlcea County
Localities in Muntenia